Mylothris agathina, the eastern dotted border or common dotted border, is a butterfly of the family Pieridae. It is native to sub-Saharan Africa, particularly East Africa  and southern Africa. In South Africa its range has spread westwards around the coast in the late 20th century, and it now occurs north of Cape Town to somewhat beyond Saldanha.

The slow-flying adults are on wing year-round, with peaks in October and from late February to April. The gregarious larvae feed on Tapinanthus oleifolius, Tapinanthus rubromarginatus, Erianthemum dregei, Teighemia quinquenervia, Ximenia caffra, Osyris lanceolata, and Osyris compressa (formerly Colpoon compressum). The pupae resemble bird droppings.

Subspecies
Mylothris agathina agathina – Sudan, Ethiopia, Somalia, Kenya (east of the Rift Valley), Tanzania, DRC (south), Angola, Zambia, Malawi, Namibia, Zimbabwe, Botswana, Mozambique, Eswatini and South Africa (Limpopo, Mpumalanga, North West, Gauteng, KwaZulu-Natal, Eastern and Western Cape provinces) 
Mylothris agathina richlora Suffert, 1904 – Cameroon, Central African Republic, DRC (Ituri province) and Uganda

References

External links

Seitz, A. Die Gross-Schmetterlinge der Erde 13: Die Afrikanischen Tagfalter. Plate XIII 10
Seitz, A. Die Gross-Schmetterlinge der Erde 13: Die Afrikanischen Tagfalter. Plate XIII 12
Seitz, A. Die Gross-Schmetterlinge der Erde 13: Die Afrikanischen Tagfalter. Plate XIII 14

Pierini
Butterflies of Africa
Butterflies described in 1779